is a Japanese ballerina.

Career 
3rd Prize in the Junior Class at the 1991 Asian Pacific International Ballet Competition.
Won the Scholarship prize of Prix de Lausanne (the International dance competition in Lausanne) in 1992.
Studied at the Royal Ballet School in England from 1992.
Joined Zürcher Ballett in 1994.
Joined Tanz-Forum Köln as a soloist in 1996.
Joined Euregio Tanz-Forum as a soloist in 1998.
Joined Staatstheater Saarbrücken as a soloist in 1999.
Joined Berlin Ballett as a soloist in 2000.
Joined Theater Basel as a soloist in 2001.

External links 
HP
Theater Basel

People educated at the Royal Ballet School
Japanese ballerinas
People from Chiba Prefecture
People from Tokyo
1977 births
Living people
Prix de Lausanne winners